ANSA Merchant Bank Limited was founded in 1998 as ANSA Finance & Merchant Bank. It is a merchant bank located in Trinidad and Tobago. The bank provides services such as auto financing, asset finance, investment services and merchant banking. ANSA Merchant Bank is also a subsidiary of ANSA McAL group.
On December 11, 2020, ANSA Merchant Bank Limited purchased the Trinidad and Tobago locations of the Indian Bank of Baroda. In April 2021 the Bank of Baroda branches were rebranded as Ansa Bank branches, Ansa Bank being the bank branch subsidiary of Ansa Merchant Bank. Other subsidiaries are Tatil (general insurances) and Tatil Life (life insurances).

References 

Banks established in 1998
Banks of Trinidad and Tobago